Puthenkurish is a town in Ernakulam district in the Indian state of Kerala near Kolenchery town en route to Muvattupuzha. It is a part of the Greater Cochin area. Puthencruz is one of the fastest developing villages in Ernakulam district. Puthencruz plays a pivotal role in connecting different smaller villages and other surrounding towns to Ernakulam as it lies in the outer ring of Ernakulam City. Puthencruz is rapidly developing into a city and will be at the pivot of expansion of the Ernakulam municipal area.

Etymology 
The name Puthencruz is a Portuguesisation of the Malayalam word പുത്തൻകുരിശ് (puthan kuriśŭ), which means New Cross. The settlement was previously known as 'Pannikkuzhy kara'. The origin of the name of the place is synonymous with the establishment of a new cross by the Syrian Christians who were the parishioners of Kolenchery St. Peter's & St. Paul's Syrian Jacobite Church in the year 1816 AD. Kolenchery Church was built in the 7th century, and has many subsidiary ones like Kurinji and Poothrikka. When the new cross was established as a belief by the locals to get rid of an infectious disease called "Masoori", the procession of the main festival from the mother church of Kolenchery extended up to Pannikuzhy kara, the people started to tell that "the procession shall extend to the Puthen Kurisu". The name of the place in time changed to Puthankurisu, and was Portuguesised to Puthencruz.  Earlier names of this place was also termed as 'Puttumanoor' and 'Puliyirangum Kara' in many records. There is a very ancient temple which was known as 'Chaarapparambathu Bhagavathy Temple' later came to known as 'Puthenkaavu Bhagavathy Temple'.

Demographics
 India census, Puthencruz had a population of 23878 with 12026 males and 11852 females.

Education

Colleges
 St.Thomas Arts & Science College
Patriarch Ignatius Zakka First Training College, Malecruz-Puthencruz
Muthoot institute of Technology and Science, Varickoli
 BTC Public School, Puthencruz
 Mar Athanasius Memorial Higher Secondary School
 M.G.M High School www.mgmhs.in
 Government Upper Primary School, Puthencruz
 Hagia Sophia Public School
 R.M.H.S.S vadavucode
 G.L.P.S Vadavucode
 G.U.P.S Puttumanoor

Religion

Temples
 Chaarapparambathu Bhagavathy Temple, also known as Puthenkaavu Bhagavathy Temple

Churches
 Sharon Fellowship Church, Karimugal 
 St.peter's and St Paul's Jacobite Syrian Orthodox Church
India Pentecostal Church of God, Kothamangalam
 Mar Ignatious Alias Chapel
 Little Flower Syro- Malabar Catholic Church https://goo.gl/maps/nC8EiPigFt9EGt127   https://goo.gl/maps/MAfVA28bGvYz7c9A8
 St. George Roman (Latin) Catholic Church https://goo.gl/maps/VYqaw93VRcUd9N4b8
 Mar Athanasius Patriarchal Cathedral

Religious Institutions
 Patriarchal Center - Headquarters of Jacobite Syrian society Christian Church in India
 St. George's Dayro, Malecruz

Financial institutions
 State Bank of India
 Union Bank of India
 Federal Bank
 Vadavucode Farmers Co-operative Bank Branch
 South Indian Bank
 Kerala State Financial Enterprises
 Servants Co-operative Bank
 Aditya birla capital (Stock Broking)

Government institutions
 Electricity Board
 BSNL Office
 Registration Office
 Village Office
 Krishi Bhavan
 Post Office
 Grama Panchayath Office http://lsgkerala.in/puthencruzpanchayat/vadavucode-puthencruz/

Other organisations
 Puthencruz Cultural Center (PCC), a local initiative for raising social and environmental awareness

Location

References

Villages in Ernakulam district
Suburbs of Kochi